

List of Ambassadors

Minister David Hacohen 1953 - 1955
Minister Yaacov Shimoni 1955 - 1957
Daniel Lewin 1957 - 1960
Eliashiv Ben-Horin 1960 - 1963
Mesholam Veron 1964 - 1968
Zvi Brosh 1968 - 1970
Arieh Eilan 1970 - 1973
David Marmor 1973 - 1977
Shmuel Ovnat 1977 - 1979
Kalman Anner 1979 - 1983
Ori Noy 1990 - 1993
Mordechai Carni 1993 - 1996
Gad Nathan 1996 - 2000
Baruch Ram 2000 - 2001
Yaacov Avrahamy 2002 - 2004
Ruth Schatz 2004 - 2008
Yaron Mayer 2008 - 2012
Hagay-Moshe Behar 2012 - 2014
Daniel Zohar-Zonshine 2014 - 2018
Ronen Gil-Or 2018 - present

See also 

 Israel–Myanmar relations

References 

Myanmar
Israel